Obiteljski Radio Valentino  or ORV is a Bosnian commercial radio station, broadcasting from Bijela in Brčko District.

Radio was founded on 6 August 1995. The station focuses on turbo-folk music and talk shows that is usually ordered by listeners, by phone, SMS or internet. Estimated number of potential listeners of ORV is around 848.877. The program is also broadcast via web and satellite (Eutelsat W2, 16 degrees E, frequency 11.366, symbol rate 30.000, FEC 3/4).

In the media market of Bosnia and Herzegovina, Obiteljski Radio Valentino is a part of the media group called DENI-COMPANI along with sister TV channels: Obiteljska televizija Valentino, VALENTINO ETNO, Valentino Music HD and PRVA HERCEGOVAČKA.

Frequencies
The program is currently broadcast at 18 frequencies in Bosnia and Herzegovina cities:

 Sanski Most 
 Ilijaš 
 Fojnica 
 Bosansko Grahovo 
 Majevica 
 Višegrad 
 Jajce 
 Žepče 
 Gradačac 
 Drvar 
 Vareš 
 Velika Kladuša 
 Stolac 
 Glamoč 
 Olovo 
 Tuzla 
 Drvar 
 Donji Vakuf

References

External links 
 Official website
 Communications Regulatory Agency of Bosnia and Herzegovina
 ORV and OTV in Facebook

See also 
List of radio stations in Bosnia and Herzegovina

Brčko
Radio stations established in 1995
Mass media in Brčko